Vitale II Michiel (also spelled Vital II Michiel) was Doge of Venice from 1156 to 1172.

Vitale Michiel became Doge of Venice at a time when Venice's relations with the Byzantine Empire were becoming increasingly strained. At the same time, on account of the growing profitability of mainland Italian markets, Venice was trying to remain on good terms with the Western Emperor, Frederick Barbarossa. But eventually, Venice was to come into conflict with both East and West.

In 1158, much of Northern Italy was in open revolt against Frederick after his crossing of the Alps. In August 1159, the towns of Milan, Crema, Brescia and Piacenza founded the Lombard League with backing from Pope Adrian and the Kingdom of Sicily. On September 1, 1159, Pope Adrian died, and during the enthronement of his elected successor, Alexander III, the papacy was usurped by a supporter of Frederick, Victor IV. The papacy was disputed for the next 18 years, although most of Europe backed Alexander III. Venice also declared for Alexander III, fearing that Frederick would treat Venice in much the same way as the rest of North Italy. Padua, Verona and Ferrara, which were loyal to Frederick, attacked Venice but were easily defeated. Next, Frederick engaged The Patriarch of Aquileia to attack Grado. This attack also failed, and merely resulted in Grado having to pay an annual tribute to Venice - a dozen pigs annually on the Wednesday before Lent. These pigs were chased around the Piazza on the following day by the people of Venice.

Although Frederick Barbarossa would have liked Venice subdued, he had more pressing problems to deal with elsewhere in Italy. For example, he wanted to reclaim Ancona from Byzantium and to continue opposition to Norman Sicily. On these fronts he failed. However, he succeeded in installing another anti-Pope in Rome - Paschal. The Romans fought ferociously to keep Frederick's forces out. St Peter's Basilica was heavily defended and held out for eight days.  But eventually the Imperial forces broke in and left the marble pavement of the nave strewn with dead and dying, and the high altar itself stained with blood. On July 30, 1167 anti-Pope Paschal celebrated Mass. Subsequently, Frederick's army was virtually destroyed by pestilence, which most of Europe considered divine retribution for the desecration of St. Peter's. Venice became a founding state of the Greater Lombard League on December 1, 1167.

At this time, there were many Latins in Constantinople enjoying privileges given them by Manuel and earlier Byzantine Emperors. Most of these were Venetians, who were generally regarded as arrogant, and scornful of the Eastern Empire. Manuel began to reduce the privileges of Venice, and to improve the position of her rivals: Pisa, Genoa and Amalfi. Manuel also captured much of the Dalmatian coast from Stephen III of Hungary, which was another irritation to Venice.

Relations with Byzantium deteriorate

In 1171, the Genoese settlement in Constantinople was attacked and largely destroyed. The Byzantine Emperor Manuel Comnenus blamed the Venetians and on March 12, 1171, orders were given for all Venetian citizens on Byzantine territory to be arrested, and their ships and property confiscated. The old alliance between Venice and Byzantium was over. In order to finance a war against the Eastern Empire, the six districts of Venice were founded to tax the Venetian citizens: San Marco, San Polo, Santa Croce, Dorsoduro, Castello and Cannaregio. In September 1171, Doge Vitale Michiel led an armada of 120 ships out of the Lagoon to attack Byzantium. Venetian ambassadors met Byzantine representatives and agreed a truce, which was a stalling tactic by Manuel. As talks dragged on through the winter, the Venetian fleet waited at Chios. An outbreak of the plague struck down thousands of the Venetians. The Venetian ambassadors then returned empty-handed from Constantinople, their mission had been a total failure.

In May 1172, Doge Vitale Michiel faced a General Assembly at the Ducal Palace to defend his actions. He had presided over the near total destruction of the Venetian fleet, and was accused of gullibility over falling into the Byzantine trap. He also stood accused of bringing the plague back to the City. The Assembly was against him, and an angry mob gathered outside the Palace. He attempted to flee to the convent of S. Zaccaria over the Ponte della Paglia, but near the Calle della Rasse he was stabbed to death by one of the mob. Venice had not lost a Doge by murder at home for more than 200 years, a fact that caused much soul-searching by the citizens, and led to constitutional reform.

Doge Vitale Michiel II's rule had lasted 16 years. For 15 years of those years, he had led the Most Serene Republic well in a difficult period, balancing Venice between the Western and Eastern Empires. He was married to the daughter of Bohemund of Antioch, Felicita Maria di Boemodo. His son, Nicolo, married the Hungarian princess Maria, daughter of Ladislaus II.

Today there is no monument in Venice to Doge Vitale Michiel II, but until relatively recently there was at least evidence of his downfall. His murderer had been found and executed, and his house destroyed. A decree was then passed that no stone building should ever be built on the site again. Right up to 1948 the decree was followed:  pictures and photographs prior to that year show only small and simple wooden buildings on one of the most strategic sites in all Venice.

References

Michele
Year of birth unknown
1172 deaths